The Republic of the Congo  (Brazzaville) is a one-party dominant state with the Congolese Labour Party in power. Opposition parties are allowed, but are widely considered to have no real chance of gaining power.

List

Parliamentary parties with more than one seat

Other parties 

 Citizen Rally (Rassemblement Citoyen, RC)
 Congolese Movement for Democracy and Integral Development (Mouvement congolais pour la démocratie et le développement intégral, MCDDI)
 Convention for Democracy and Salvation (Convention pour la Démocratie et le Salut, CDS)
 Life Party (Parti la Vie)
 Movement for Democracy and Progress (Mouvement pour la démocratie et le progrès, MDP)
 Movement for Solidarity and Development (Mouvement pour la solidarité et le développement, MSD)
 New Democratic Forces (Forces démocratiques nouvelles, FDN)
 Patriotic Front (Front Patriotique, FP)
 Patriotic Union for Democracy and Progress (Union Patriotique pour la Démocratie et le Progrès, UPDP)
 Rally for Democracy and Development (Rassemblement pour la démocratie et le développement, RDD)
 Union for Democracy and Republic (Union pour la Démocratie et la République-Mwinda, UDR-Mwinda)
 Union of Democratic Forces (Union des Forces Démocratiques, UFD)
 Union for Democratic Renewal (Union pour la Renouveau Démocratique, URD)
 Union for a People's Movement (Union pour un mouvement populaire, UMP)
 Union for Progress (Union pour le Progrès, UPP)
 Union for the Republic (Union pour la République, UPR)
 United Democratic Forces (Forces Démocratiques Unies, FDU)
 Take Action for Congo (AGIR pour le Congo, AGIR)
 Youth in Movement (Jeunesse en Mouvement)

Congo, Republic of the

Political parties
Political parties
Congo, Republic of the